The 2016 Boyd Gaming 300 was the 3rd stock car race of the 2016 NASCAR Xfinity Series season and the 20th iteration of the event. The race was held on Saturday, March 5, 2016, in Las Vegas, Nevada, at Las Vegas Motor Speedway a 1.5 miles (2.41 km) permanent D-shaped oval racetrac. The race took the scheduled 200 laps to complete. Kyle Busch, driving for Joe Gibbs Racing led a dominating 199 out of 200 laps to earn his 78th career NASCAR Xfinity Series win and his second of the season. To fill out the podium, Daniel Suarez of Joe Gibbs Racing and Erik Jones, also of Joe Gibbs Racing, would finish second and third, respectively.

Background 

Las Vegas Motor Speedway, located in Clark County, Nevada outside the Las Vegas city limits and about 15 miles northeast of the Las Vegas Strip, is a 1,200-acre (490 ha) complex of multiple tracks for motorsports racing. The complex is owned by Speedway Motorsports, Inc., which is headquartered in Charlotte, North Carolina.

Entry list 

 (R) denotes rookie driver.
 (i) denotes driver who is ineligible for series driver points.

Practice

First practice 
The first practice session was held on Friday, March 4 at 4:05 PM EST.

Second and final practice 
The final practice session, sometimes referred to as Happy Hour, was held on Friday, March 4, at 6:05 PM EST.

Qualifying 
Qualifying was held on Saturday, March 5. Since Las Vegas Motor Speedway is under , the qualifying system was a multi-car system that included three rounds. The first round was 15 minutes, where every driver would be able to set a lap within the 15 minutes. Then, the second round would consist of the fastest 24 cars in Round 1, and drivers would have 10 minutes to set a lap. Round 3 consisted of the fastest 12 drivers from Round 2, and the drivers would have 5 minutes to set a time. Whoever was fastest in Round 3 would win the pole.

Derrike Cope and Todd Peck failed to qualify.

Full qualifying results

Race results

Standings after the race 

Drivers' Championship standings

Note: Only the first 12 positions are included for the driver standings.

References 

2016 NASCAR Xfinity Series
NASCAR races at Las Vegas Motor Speedway
March 2016 sports events in the United States